Breza (the word for birch in several Slavic languages) may refer to:

Places
 Breza, Bosnia and Herzegovina, a town in Bosnia and Herzegovina
 Breza, Smolyan Province in Rudozem Municipality, Bulgaria
 Breza, Bjelovar-Bilogora County, a village near Bjelovar, Croatia
 Breza, Primorje-Gorski Kotar County, a village near Klana, Croatia
 Breza, Kolašin, a village in Montenegro
 Breza (Sjenica), a village in Serbia
 Breza, Slovakia, a village near Námestovo, Slovakia
 Breza, Trebnje, a village in the Municipality of Trebnje, southeastern Slovenia
 Mala Breza, a village in the Municipality of Laško, eastern Slovenia

Other
 Breza (film), 1967 Yugoslav film